Shots is the second full-length album by Vancouver indie rock band Ladyhawk. It was released on Jagjaguwar on March 4, 2008 in North America, and on April 7, 2008 in the UK.

Track listing 
All tracks written by Duffy Driediger/Darcy Hancock/Sean Hawryluk/Ryan Peters.
"I Don't Always Know What You're Saying" – 4:17
"S.T.H.D." – 1:58
"Fear" – 4:16
"Corpse Paint" – 4:17
"(I'll Be Your) Ashtray" – 4:13
"Faces Of Death" – 4:46
"Night You're Beautiful" – 3:03
"You Ran" – 1:50
"Ghost Blues" – 10:35
"Crows Commute (Bonus Track)" - 3:04

References

External links 

2008 albums
Ladyhawk (band) albums